Deezer is a French online music streaming service. It allows users to listen to music content from record labels, as well as podcasts on various devices online or offline. 

Created in Paris, Deezer currently has 90 million licensed tracks in its library, with over 30,000 radio channels, 100 million playlists, 16 million monthly active users, and 7 million paid subscribers as of January 2019. 

The service is available for Web, Android, iOS, Windows Mobile, BlackBerry OS, Windows, and MacOS.

History

In 2006, Daniel Marhely developed the first version of Deezer, called Blogmusik, in Paris. His idea was to give unlimited access to music lovers through streaming technology.

The site in its original incarnation was charged with copyright infringement by French agency SACEM and shut down in April 2007. It was relaunched as Deezer in August 2007, having reached an agreement with SACEM to pay copyright holders with revenue from advertising on the site and by giving users the ability to download songs streamed on Deezer from iTunes, with Deezer receiving a commission from each purchase.

Launch
At the time of its launch in 2007, Deezer had not yet negotiated agreements with major music labels and therefore offered a limited catalogue. It took more than two years for agreements to be signed with the four largest labels, as well as various smaller ones, but by 2011 the company had rights to about eight million songs. During its first month of operations, Deezer's website had about 773,000 visitors, and traffic increased rapidly in the next several years. By May 2008, 2.75 million people used the service each month, and there were seven million users by December 2009.

Despite the high traffic, Deezer almost immediately ran into financial problems. During the first half of 2008, the company saw revenue of just 875,000 euros, which was not enough to pay its licensing fees. In July 2008, the company began running ads itself through advertising agency Deezer Media. In October 2008, Deezer secured $8.4 million in funding from AGF Private Equity and CM-CIC Capital Prive, bringing total investment in the company to $15.8 million. The company introduced mandatory registration in February 2009 to gather more precise data on users, to run more targeted ads, and in November 2009 began running audio ads between songs.

On 5 November 2009, Deezer launched a new three-tier service model. While continuing basic free web streaming, the company also introduced two subscription services: users paying €4.99 monthly received higher audio quality music without ads, and users paying €9.99 monthly gained access to downloadable applications for computers, as well as Android, BlackBerry and iOS mobile devices.

In January 2010, the company's CEO and co-founder, Jonathan Benassaya, was replaced as CEO by Axel Dauchez, after fewer than 15,000 of Deezer's 12 million users signed up for its subscription services. In August 2010, mobile operator Orange partnered with Deezer in a deal to include free access to Deezer Premium, the highest tier of Deezer's streaming packages, with some of Orange's telecommunications contracts in France. Almost immediately after the partnership began, the rate of users signing up for Deezer's premium services went from 6,000 a month to 100,000. By January 2011, 500,000 people were subscribing to the service, and the millionth subscriber mark joined in the middle of 2011, which was half a year ahead of Deezer's expectation. The two companies expanded their partnership in September 2011 to include Orange contract customers in the UK. Also in September, Deezer added Facebook integration to its service, allowing users to send music to one another via that social media service.

International expansion

Deezer was launched in France in 2007, where it was the market leader as of 2017. On 7 December 2011, Deezer, at the time available only in Belgium, France and the United Kingdom, announced plans to expand worldwide during the rest of 2011 and continuing into 2012. According to the company, it planned to make its services available to all of Europe by the end of the year, to the Americas (excluding the United States) by the end of January 2012, to Africa and Southeast Asia by the end of February, and the rest of the world (excluding Japan) by the end of June.

Service was not available across the whole of Europe until 15 March 2012, and service launched in Australia, Canada, and New Zealand on 25 April. On 8 June, Deezer announced availability in 35 Latin American countries, though not in Brazil, Cuba, or Venezuela. On 15 August, Deezer announced it would be available in Indonesia, Malaysia, Pakistan, the Philippines, Singapore, and Thailand within several weeks.

On 8 October 2012, Deezer announced that it had received $130 million in funding from Access Industries, to be used for further international expansion. Two days later, the company announced that it had expanded into 76 new markets, bringing its worldwide total to 160 countries. On 21 December, Deezer announced a new service level offering two hours of free, ad-supported music streaming a month, available to users worldwide, the company's first free music streaming service outside France. CEO Dauchez said that Deezer was also looking for a partner to introduce service in the United States, who was "able to provide us with a significant volume of subscribers" to help offset what he called the "unbelievably high" costs of entering the US market.

As of December 2012, Deezer had about two million users paying for subscriptions, out of a monthly active user base of about seven million, with 20 million songs in its library. By 2016, according to CEO Dauchez, the company aimed to have five percent of the global music market.

In January 2013, Deezer announced its expansion into 22 new countries across Africa, Asia, Brazil, the Middle East, and the United States, bringing its total to 182. However, the US launch has been restricted to a limited number of device promotions. In July 2016, Deezer added the U.S. to the supported country list. As of November 2021, Deezer listed on its website 187 regions where the service was available.

After expansion
Following this expansion, in 2013 Deezer announced partnerships with LG Electronics, Samsung Electronics and Toshiba, which meant Deezer apps were available on smart TV platforms, along with a new brand identity developed in association with the illustrator mcbess.

Since then, Deezer has made a number of announcements, including its Developer Reward Scheme, mobile App Studio and API upgrades, a new, exclusive beta version of its mobile app for Android users, and the new Deezer app for Windows 8.

April 2013 also saw Deezer update its iOS app with a new smart caching feature, allowing the app to identify and remember a user's most played tracks, even in areas of poor network coverage.

In June 2014, Deezer announced a new partnership with Samsung giving Samsung Galaxy S5 users in Europe a free, six months Deezer Premium+ subscription. Samsung and Deezer extended their partnership by offering a six-month, free of charge subscription to Deezer Premium+ for Samsung's Multiroom Wireless Audio Products, including its M5 and M7 line of Multiroom wireless audio speakers. Samsung UK and Deezer offered this promotion again from 2016-2018.

In June 2014, Deezer and Google announced that the Google Chromecast would be supporting Deezer's Android and iPhone apps to allow users to stream music from their phone to their televisions through the Chromecast. Chromecast support became available to Deezer Premium+ users from 25 June 2014 onwards in Australia, Belgium, Brazil, Canada, Finland, France, Germany, the Netherlands, Norway, Portugal, South Korea, Spain, Sweden, Switzerland, and the United Kingdom. 

In September 2014, Deezer announced Deezer Elite, a new exclusive service made for and in partnership with Sonos. Deezer Elite provides CD-quality audio to U.S. users of Sonos Hi-Fi Systems. The service is available worldwide to Sonos users of Deezer only. Deezer Elite "High-Resolution Audio" is lossless CD quality (16bit/44.1 kHz) and not "Hi-Res" or high-resolution audio. Sonos does not support Hi-Res (24/96, 24/192 or similar) streaming.

In the US, Deezer HiFi offers 36 million tracks of 16-Bit/44.1 kHz of FLAC quality music for a $19.95 monthly subscription. It is "Only available on selected soundsystems and the Desktop App," and offers downloads to phones at 320 kbit/s.

In October 2014, Deezer rolled out a new user interface for its website player. This new change in design was widely welcomed by numerous users.

In October 2014, Deezer announced that Bose SoundTouch and SoundLink products would now be supported for Deezer Premium+ service. This partnership will first be rolled out in the United States and then will be available to worldwide users.

In October 2014, Deezer announced that Stitcher Radio would be merging into Deezer. By 2015, Deezer users would be able to use Stitcher Radio features within Deezer.

In December 2014, Deezer and Pepsi announced a partnership to set up the Midem Artist Accelerator to support managers and labels as they grow the profiles of their artists. In June 2016, it sold Stitcher to E.W. Scripps Company for $4.5 million

In December 2018, Deezer integrated Triton Digital to monetize the free users with programmatic audio ads. Deezer also pushes banner advertisements for WAZE, even for premium subscribers.

On 7 November 2019, Deezer released Spleeter, an open-source "audio source separation" utility written in Python that uses the TensorFlow machine learning library and pretrained models for audio stem extraction.

In September 2020, Deezer joined a number of tech companies in the Coalition for App Fairness led by Epic Games to demand better conditions for the inclusion of their apps in the app stores of Apple and Google.

In the first quarter of 2021, Deezer held a 2% market share of the music streaming service market. In July 2021, Deezer announced that from now on free account users can use Google Assistant speakers to stream music. That means with a Google Home or Nest Home device, it's possible to stream Deezer music without being a paid subscriber.

On 19 April 2022, Deezer Free (ad-supported version) has been discontinued in multiple countries worldwide, which now requires a paid account to listen to music.

On 5 July 2022, Deezer had its first day on the market as a publicly traded company.

Last.fm integration
In January 2012, Last.fm announced that Deezer would integrate with Last.fm, allowing users to send songs from Deezer to their Last.fm account and "scrobble" them.

API Exploit
In 2017, third party services like Deemix and Freezer.life was known to exploit Deezer's API in fetching songs from their database, whereby users were able to stream and download the songs in high quality format. In 2021, this security loophole was fixed and users were required to obtain a paid account to download the high quality format of songs.

Accounts and subscriptions
As of March 2019 there are 6 Deezer account types. All subscriptions feature unlimited track playing and support for mobile devices. The Discovery tier only has access to the Playlist/Artist Mix and Flow features on mobile devices.

Quality
Some titles are also available in FLAC for pay.

See also
 List of streaming media systems
 Comparison of on-demand music streaming services

References

External links
 

French music websites
Music streaming services
IOS software
Internet properties established in 2007
Android (operating system) software
Windows Phone software
Symbian software
Universal Windows Platform apps
Companies based in Paris